Graeme Farrell can refer to:

 Graeme Farrell (South Australia cricketer) (1943–2013), Australian cricketer
 Graeme Farrell (Tasmania cricketer) (born 1947), Australian cricketer